Awaken is the debut solo studio album of American rapper Koncept released on 12 January 2012 through Soulspazm Records. With music production from J57 and Marco Polo, the album is an 11-track project with guest vocal appearances from Soul Khan, Sene and Royce da 5'9".

Track listing

Personnel
Keith Whitehead – rapping
James Heinz – producer
Marco Bruno – producer
Noah Weston – featured artist
Sene – featured artist
Ryan Montgomey – featured artist

Release history

References

External links

2012 debut albums
Koncept albums
Albums produced by J57
Albums produced by Marco Polo